Kaltenbach is a municipality in the Schwaz district in the Austrian state of Tyrol.

Geography
Kaltenbach lies in the central Ziller valley on the left bank of the Ziller, across from Stumm.

References

Cities and towns in Schwaz District